The River class was a class of fourteen destroyers of the Royal Canadian Navy (RCN) that served before and during the Second World War. They were named after Canadian rivers.

The River class was a dissimilar collection of warships, consisting of twelve vessels purchased from the Royal Navy and two built specifically by British yards for the RCN. They included two A class, five C class, two D class, one E class, two F class, one G class and one H class.

History
The majority of the River-class ships began the Second World War with the same equipment that they were built with; however, this was gradually modified as the war progressed. Modifications included removing gun mounts to make room for additional depth charge and torpedo systems, as well as adding new communications and radar masts. The River class were the backbone of the RCN destroyer fleet and served as leaders of the Mid-Ocean Escort Force during the Battle of the Atlantic. Saguenay lost much of her stern in a November 1942 collision, and was subsequently relegated to training duties. The surviving ships were all decommissioned and scrapped following the war.

1939
On 23 October 1939, the German-flagged tanker Emmy Friederich scuttled herself on encountering Saguenay in the Yucatán Channel.

1940
On 8 March 1940 Assiniboine, along with  intercepted and captured the German merchant ship Hannover near Jamaica. Hannover was later converted into .

On the night of 25 June 1940, Fraser was tasked to join the destroyer  and light cruiser  on Operation Aerial to rescue 4,000 refugees trapped by the German Army from the coast of Bordeaux, France. The warships encountered rough seas and poor visibility, forcing the commanding officer of Fraser to close quarters with the other two vessels. Fraser executed a turn to port to bring the ship behind Calcutta but in doing so, the two ships collided. The bow of the heavier Calcutta sliced into Fraser with such force that the destroyer was cut into three pieces. Fraser lost 47 sailors, and a further 19 were lost from Calcutta. Many of the survivors from Fraser transferred that summer to Margaree and were lost when that vessel sank on 22 October 1940 as a result of a collision with the freighter .

Margaree was lost on 22 October 1940, when she collided with the freighter MV Port Fairy at position . Of the 176 aboard Margaree at the time, 34 were rescued by Port Fairy, but the other 142, including the captain and four other officers, were lost.

In November, Ottawa assisted  in sinking the Italian submarine .

1941

1942

Less than 30 minutes later, unable to maneuver, she was hit by a second torpedo. The second attack broke her in half, sinking her. 114 crew lost their lives, including the commanding officer, while 65 survivors were rescued by nearby vessels.

On 15 November 1942, Saguenay was rammed by the Panamanian freighter Azra off Cape Race, Newfoundland. The impact of the collision set off Saguenays depth charges, which blew off her stern. She made port at Saint John, New Brunswick, where her stern was plated over. On 23 May 1943, Saguenay was transferred to Halifax, to serve with the Western Ocean Escort Force working from Halifax and St. John's, Newfoundland. She was used for teaching seamanship and gunnery until 30 July 1945, paid off in late 1945, and broken up in 1946.

1943
She made Liverpool on 7 March and took 3 months to repair.

, formerly HMS Fortune joined the River class in May 1943. HMCS Gatineau joined in June.

1944
On 6 March 1944 at 1830 hrs, the German U-boat  was sunk in the North Atlantic, in position  following a lengthy hunt to exhaustion. It was initially torpedoed by the British   and an unsuccessful attempt was made at towing the submarine to port.

On 6 July 1944, Ottawa and Kootenay were detached from a convoy to assist HMS Statice with a submarine contact off Beachy Head, Sussex. As Ottawa swept the area, she gained sonar contact and attacked with depth charges. Shortly afterward, large amounts of debris appeared on the surface, including caps marked U-678.

On 7 July 1944, Kootenay, Ottawa, and the corvette  depth-charged and sank the German VIIC-class U-boat  in the English Channel south-west of Brighton.

On 18 August Kootenay, Ottawa, and Chaudière depth-charged and sank the German VIIC-class U-boat  in the Bay of Biscay near La Rochelle. On 20 August, the same ships depth-charged and sank the German VIIC-class U-boat  in the Bay of Biscay west of Brest.

Skeena was lost in a storm on the night of 24 October 1944. She was anchored off Reykjavík, Iceland and dragged her anchor and grounded in  waves off Viðey Island with the loss of 15 of her crew. Her hulk was written off and sold to Icelandic interests in June 1945; she was then raised and broken up. Her propeller was salvaged and used in a memorial near the Viðey Island ferry terminal.

1945
On 14 February 1945 Assiniboine collided with merchant ship Empire Bond in the English Channel. She made Sheerness for repairs and was operational again in early March.

Ships

Notes and references

Sources
 Butterley, Keith, and Macpherson, Ken. River class destroyers of the Royal Canadian Navy. 2nd ed. St. Catharines, Ont. : Vanwell Pub., c2008. 
 
 
 Macpherson, Kenneth R. and Barrie, Ron. (2002)(Third Edition) The Ships of Canada's Naval Forces 1910–2002. Vanwell Publishing.

External links

Destroyer classes
 
River class destroyers